The Red Ribbon Pairs national bridge championship is held annually at the Summer American Contract Bridge League (ACBL) North American Bridge Championship (NABC). Prior to the 2015 Summer NABC, the Red Ribbon Pairs event was held at the Spring NABC.

The Red Ribbon Pairs is a four-session matchpoint (MP) pairs event with two qualifying and two final sessions. The event typically starts on the second Thursday of the NABC. The event is restricted to those with fewer than 2,500 masterpoints and have earned a red ribbon qualification.

History
The Red Ribbon Pairs is an ACBL event with national rating open to players with fewer than 2500 masterpoints. Players earn qualification by placing first or second overall in regionally rated events of at least Flight B status. Neither member of a qualifying pair may hold more than 2500 masterpoints at the time of qualification.

The four-session event began in 1986.  The first repeat winner occurred in 2007 when Paul Spear duplicated his win from 1998.  The first repeat winning partnership occurred in 2016 when Paul Hattis and James Orleans won their second consecutive Red Ribbon Pairs Championship.

Bean Trophy
The Bean Trophy was designated by the ACBL Board of Directors in 1996 to honor Percy Bean, ACBL president in 1972 and chairman of the board in 1973.

Bean (1916–1992) represented District 19 on the Board from 1964 until 1988 and served as president of the ACBL Charity Foundation from 1974 until 1981. He was a member of the National Goodwill Committee and the National Board of Governors and general chairman of arrangements for the World Team Olympiad in Seattle in 1984. Bean was the editor of Mad, Mad World of Bridge, a publication that strongly championed players of less than expert class.

Winners

Sources

List of previous winners, Page 20

2009 winners, Page 1

External links
ACBL official website

North American Bridge Championships